Jagdgeschwader 77 (JG 77) Herz As ("Ace of Hearts") was a Luftwaffe fighter wing during World War II. It served in all the German theaters of war, from Western Europe to the Eastern Front, and from the high north in Norway to the Mediterranean.

All three gruppen (groups) within the unit operated variants of the Messerschmitt Bf 109. II. Gruppe was the only German unit entirely equipped, albeit only during November–December 1943, with the Macchi C.205, a highly regarded Italian fighter.

Formation
Initially, JG 77 was created with two Gruppen (groups) and without a Geschwaderstab (headquarters unit). I. Gruppe of JG 77 was created from IV. Gruppe of Jagdgeschwader 132 (JG 132—132nd Fighter Wing), which had become I. Gruppe of Jagdgeschwader 331 (JG 331—331st Fighter Wing) on 3 November 1938 before it was renamed to I. Gruppe of JG 77 on 1 May 1939. II. Gruppe of JG 77 was derived from one of the oldest units of the Luftwaffe and based on the Küstenjagdgruppe (Coastal Fighter Group) named I./136. On 1 October 1936, this unit was relabeled and became I. Gruppe of Jagdgeschwader 136 (JG 136—136th Fighter Wing), which was then renamed to II. Gruppe of Jagdgeschwader 333 (JG 333—333rd Fighter Wing) on 1 November 1938 before it became II. Gruppe of JG 77 on 1 May 1939. The Geschwaderstab was eventually formed on 1 October 1939 at Neumünster and its first Geschwaderkommodore (wing commander) was Oberstleutnant Eitel Roediger von Manteuffel.

III. Gruppe of JG 77 was formed on the Trägerjagdgruppe (Carrier Fighter Group) with the designation II./186 (T), at the time based at Trondheim, Norway. I./JG 77 was reorganized on 21 November 1940 into IV./JG 51 and a new I./JG 77 was established. In January 1942 I./JG 77 was transferred to I./JG 5 and a new I./JG 77 was created. In April 1942 I. Staffel was transferred to Romania and designated the defence unit for the Ploieşti oil fields at Mizil. (This staffel was redesignated I./JG 4 in August 1942.)

World War II
I./JG 77 took part in the invasion of Poland on 1 September 1939, while attached to Luftflotte 3. In April 1940 JG 77 took part in Operation Weserübung, the invasion of Norway. After the invasion of France, I. Gruppe supported 10th Air Corps (under Luftflotte 5) in operations against the United Kingdom from bases in Norway. While stationed in Norway and Denmark in 1940 II./JG 77 claimed some 79 victories, for 6 pilots killed, before leaving in November 1940 for defence duties in Brest, France. In May 1941 II. and III./JG 77 were used in support of the invasion of Greece and the paratroop assault on Crete.

Following the operations in Crete, JG 77 was withdrawn to Romania; III. Gruppe was converted to the new Bf 109F. As Operation Barbarossa, the invasion of the Soviet Union, started on 22 June 1941, II. and III. Gruppe plus Stab supported the advance East as part of Army Group South, while I. Gruppe served on the Finnish front. The Jagdgeschwader scored quickly. On 25 June, Walter Hoeckner of 6./JG 77 shot down 8 of 10 Tupolev SB claimed by III./JG 77, while on 26 June, Oblt. Kurt Ubben shot down 4 SB and Ofw. Reinhold Schmetzer shot down 5 SB.
In the period from 22 June to December 1941 the unit, and its attachment I.(J)/LG 2, destroyed 1,166 Soviet aircraft, in return for 52 losses in aerial combat and two aircraft on the ground.

I. Gruppe, which was still based in Norway, was reorganized into I. Gruppe/JG 5 in January 1942, and the entire JG 77 (with a newly created I. Gruppe) was then transferred south to the Mediterranean area from June - December 1942. JG 77 saw extensive action against the Desert Air Force fighter-bombers. Total Allied air superiority led to the various JG 77 bases in Tunisia coming under constant air attack, and a large number of Bf 109's were written off on the ground. Following the death in late March 1943 of the unit's commander Joachim Müncheberg during a mid-air collision during combat Oberstleutnant Johannes Steinhoff was appointed commander of the unit.

While I. and II./JG 77 returned to Germany to re-equip, III./JG 77 remained in Italy, based at Foggia, north-east of Naples and flying sorties into Sardinia and Sicily. In mid-June, I./JG 77 flew into Sciacca on Sicily.

The Geschwader, as part of 2nd Air Corps, was then stationed in Italy and Sicily. During the rest of 1943 and 1944 JG 77 was stationed on the Southern Front, mainly in the Balkans, Sardinia and Italy, but also in Romania. 
Luftwaffe II.Gruppe of JG 77 operated with requisitioned Macchi C.205Vs, for two months, from October until the end of 1943, in December, when the German unit was re-equipped with new Bf 109s. Thus there are photos of C.205s with black crosses painted over the mid-fuselage Italian white strip markings.

In 1945 JG 77 was relocated to Germany itself to help with the Reichsverteidigung (Defense of the Reich). In the last months of the war part of JG 77 was employed against the Soviet Air Force in Silesia. In this area on 7 March 1945 Kommodore Major Erich Leie, a 118-kill ace, was killed in combat with Yak-9 fighters.

Commanding officers

Geschwaderkommodore

Gruppenkommandeure

I. Gruppe of JG 77
First formation, IV.(l)/JG 132 was renamed to I./JG 331 on 3 November 1938 which then became the I./JG 77 on 1 May 1939.

On 3 November 1940, I. Gruppe leaves JG 77 and becomes IV. Gruppe of Jagdgeschwader 51. A new I. Gruppe was formed from I.(Jagd) Gruppe of Lehrgeschwader 2 on 6 January 1942.

II. Gruppe of JG 77
Formed from I./136 which was renamed to II./JG 333 on 1 November 1938 and then became the II./JG 77 on 1 May 1939.

III. Gruppe of JG 77
Formed from II.(T)/186 and was renamed to III./JG 77 on 5 July 1939.

Notes

References

Citations

Bibliography

 
 
 
 
 
 
 
 

Jagdgeschwader 077
Military units and formations established in 1939
Military units and formations disestablished in 1945
1939 establishments in Germany
1945 disestablishments in Germany